Giovanni Mino Balbi Di Robecco (19 November 1883 – 24 November 1964) is an Italian tennis player. He represented Italy at the 1920 Summer Olympics, competing in the Men's singles event. Balbi Di Robecco also represented Italy at the 1922 Wimbledon Championships, competing in the Men's singles event and Men's Doubles event.

In 1914, he won the Capri Watch Cup, a tennis tournament which is held annually in Italy.

References

External links
 

1883 births
1964 deaths
Italian male tennis players
Sportspeople from Genoa
Tennis players at the 1920 Summer Olympics
Olympic tennis players of Italy
20th-century Italian people